Bois-de-Haye is a commune in the Meurthe-et-Moselle department in north-eastern France. It was established on 1 January 2019 by merger of the former communes of Velaine-en-Haye (the seat) and Sexey-les-Bois.

See also
Communes of the Meurthe-et-Moselle department

References

Boisdehaye